Piccadilly is a small town in the Adelaide Hills of South Australia, Australia.

The Piccadilly Valley was for many decades a market gardening centre which produced food for the Adelaide and overseas market.  A large part of the valley is now used for growing premium 'cool climate' grape varieties.

Piccadilly is home to the Woodhouse Scout Centre, which in addition to scout jamborees hosts school camps and various outdoor activities.

Transport
Route 822 goes to the City via Carey Gully, and route 866 goes to Crafers at which point it connects to a bus to the City via the South Eastern Freeway.

See also
 Piccadilly Valley wine sub-region

Notes and references

Towns in South Australia